Animalism may refer to:

 Animalism (philosophy), the notion that humans are animals
 Animalism (album), a 1966 album by The Animals
 Animalism (Animal Farm), an allegory for communism featured in the book Animal Farm

See also
Animal (disambiguation)
Animality (disambiguation)